Disappearance is a 2017 Dutch drama film directed by Boudewijn Koole. It was shortlisted by the EYE Film Institute Netherlands as one of the eight films to be selected as the potential Dutch submission for the Academy Award for Best Foreign Language Film at the 90th Academy Awards. However, it was not selected, with Layla M. being chosen as the Dutch entry.

Cast
 Jakob Oftebro as Johnny
 Rifka Lodeizen as Roos
 Marcus Hanssen as Bengt
 Elsie de Brauw as Louise

References

External links
 

2017 films
2017 drama films
Dutch drama films
2010s Dutch-language films
Films directed by Boudewijn Koole